Isabel Ramírez Castaneda (1881–1943) was one of the first Mexican women to work as an archaeologist and ethnologist. Affiliated with the National Museum (Museo Nacional de Antropología) for most of her career, she investigated the Nahua folklore of Central Mexico and classified many archaeological collections. Ramírez Castañeda carried out the first archaeological excavation led by a woman.

Biography
Isabel Ramírez Castañeda was born in 1879 in Milpa Alta, a small town close to Mexico City. She originally studied to be a primary and preschool teacher at the Escuela Normal de Profesoras and worked as such for a number of years. She regularly attended Ateneo de la Juventud conferences.

In 1907 she met anthropologist Eduard Seler and ethnologist Caecilie Seler-Sachs in Mexico. Isabel helped study and classify archaeological artifacts and worked as an assistant during archeology lectures. In 1906 she won a scholarship to study archaeology, history and ethnology at the National Museum (Museo Nacional de Antropología), which she was affiliated to for much of her career. Isabel also met Franz Boas when he visited Mexico and she became a sort of protégée of his. 

With the Selers, Ramírez was introduced to the study of archaeology and she accompanied them in several expeditions to archaeological sites and took up the study of ancient architecture and pottery, as the first female archaeologist in Mexico. She participated in excavations at the Maya site of Palenque in 1911.

She was a native speaker of Nahuatl and contributed a series of folktales from Milpa Alta to Franz Boas who published them (without acknowledging her as the author) in 1924.

She died in 1943.

References

19th-century births
1943 deaths
Indigenous Mexicans
Nahua people
Mexican Mesoamericanists
Women Mesoamericanists
20th-century Mesoamericanists
People from Mexico City
Mexican women archaeologists
Folklorists